Austentatious is a long-form improvised comedy show, in the style of a Jane Austen novel, where each show is improvised by a six-strong cast, based on a title suggested by a member of the audience. Begun in 2011 in London, the original cast members took the show to the Edinburgh Festival Free Fringe in the summer of 2012. Following their initial success, they began performing a monthly show in London, transferring to the West End in 2017, and have since performed on BBC Radio 4, on tour, and at the Edinburgh Fringe.

Performances
Each show is performed as a self-contained comedy play in the style of Jane Austen novel, with six cast members improvising the story, accompanied by live music. Audience members are asked to suggest a title in the style of Jane Austen; past titles have included Bath to the Future (referencing both the city of Bath and the Back to the Future film), Mansfield Shark (a pun on Austen's book Mansfield Park), and Strictly Come Darcy (referring to the television show Strictly Come Dancing and Austen's character Mr. Darcy).

A title is selected from the submissions (either at random or by asking the audience to call out suggestions), and is then improvised by the cast. The cast members perform in Regency costume using tropes associated with Austen's work, other works of the period, and modern adaptations. The title is likely to influence the story, so Strictly Come Darcy may feature ballroom dancing in the plot.

History

Origin

Four of the original six members of the cast, Cooke-Hodgson, Morpurgo, Murray and Parris had been members of The Oxford Imps whilst studying in Oxford and wanted to explore long-form improvised comedy. Parris and Cooke-Hodgson originated the idea of a Jane Austen themed show, and together with fellow improvisers Lloyd and Dickson, then began performing Austentatious together.

Early success
After initial performances in London in 2011, the original cast performed the show at the 2012 Free Fringe, receiving positive reviews and sell-out crowds.

Following this success they continued to perform across the UK, adding Roberts and Gittins to the cast. They began a regular monthly show in London, initially at the Leicester Square Theatre and have returned to the Edinburgh Fringe annually, selling out the show every year from 2014 to 2018. In 2013 The Guardian'''s review gave the show four stars and described it as "one of the most enjoyable 60 minutes on the fringe".

In 2014 the show won the Chortle Award for Best Character, Improv or Sketch Act.

West End transfer
They transferred to the Piccadilly Theatre for a West End run in 2017, and have since performed in a number of West End venues, adding Shearing to the cast, most recently the Fortune Theatre from February 2019. They have performed two 30-minute shows on BBC Radio 4, and have performed in McEwan Hall, the largest space at the festival, during the Fringe.

A further residency at the Fortune Theatre was announced for February to July 2020. The residency was cut short after West End theatres shut as part of the COVID-19 lockdown. On 29 August 2020, they performed a one-off outdoor show in Streatham.

Cast
The cast currently comprises nine members, with six performing at a time.
 Amy Cooke-Hodgson (founder)
 Graham Dickson (founder)
 Cariad Lloyd (founder)
 Joseph Morpurgo (founder) – nominated for an Edinburgh Comedy Award in 2015 for solo work
 Andrew Hunter Murray (founder)
 Rachel Parris (founder)
 Charlotte Gittins
 Daniel Nils Roberts
 Lauren Shearing – also a cast member of Showstopper! The Improvised Musical''

See also
Jane Austen fan fiction

References

Improvisational theatre
2011 establishments in the United Kingdom
Adaptations of works by Jane Austen